NGC 5170 is a large, nearby, edge-on spiral galaxy in the equatorial constellation of Virgo. It was discovered on February 7, 1785 by William Herschel. It is a member of the Virgo II Groups, a series of galaxies and galaxy clusters strung out from the southern edge of the Virgo Supercluster.

It is estimated to have a morphological class of type Sb to Sc, meaning the spiral arms are moderate to loosely wound. The bulge-to-disk ratio of 0.5 is more consistent with an Sb galaxy. It has an estimated star formation rate of ·yr−1, which is more than double the rate in the Milky Way.

The galactic latitude of this star is 43°, making the field relatively free of stars in the Milky Way. Combined with the proximity and edge-on view of NGC 5170, this makes galaxy useful for studies of its globular cluster population. It is estimated to have a total of  globulars, which is much higher than for the Milky Way. A candidate ultra-compact dwarf galaxy has been identified that is associated with NGC 5170.

Numerical modeling of this galaxy indicates it has a massive dark halo with a thin, low surface brightness disk. Examination of the galaxy with the Chandra X-ray Observatory showed there is no diffuse X-ray emission from hot gas in the extended galactic halo.

References

External links
 

Unbarred spiral galaxies
Virgo (constellation)
5170
47396